T. P. R. Selvame is an Indian politician belonging to the All India N.R. Congress. He was elected from the Mannadipet constituency in Puducherry Legislative Assembly election in 2016 as well as in Puducherry Legislative Assembly election in 2011.

References

All India NR Congress politicians
Puducherry politicians
Living people
Puducherry MLAs 2011–2016
Puducherry MLAs 2016–2021
1971 births